Buhr is a surname.

Notable people with this surname include:
Arturo García Buhr, actor
Beverly Buhr, speed skater
Florence Buhr, politician
George Buhr, football coach
Gérard Buhr, actor
Glenn Buhr, composer
Karina Buhr, singer
Liane Buhr, coxswain
Reba Buhr, voice actor

Russian Mennonite surnames